The 2015–16 season of the Regionalliga was the 57th season of the third-tier football league in Austria, since its establishment in 1959.

Regionalliga Ost

Regionalliga Mitte

Regionalliga West

No promotion play-offs

Due to vacancies in the Austrian Football First League and SV Grödig's resignation from professionalism, the two-legged promotion play-offs were cancelled. Instead, WSG Wattens, champion of the Regionalliga West, and FC Blau-Weiß Linz, champion of the Regionalliga Mitte were promoted to fill those vacancies.

Top scorers
.

References

External links
 Regionalliga Ost  
 Regionalliga Mitte  
 Regionalliga West  

Austrian Regionalliga seasons
Austrian Regional League
3